SM UB-40 was a German Type UB II submarine or U-boat in the German Imperial Navy during World War I.

Design
A German Type UB II submarine, UB-40 had a displacement of  when at the surface and  while submerged. The submarine was powered by two Körting six-cylinder diesel engines producing a total , two Siemens-Schuckert electric motors producing , and one propeller shaft.

UB-40 was fitted with two  torpedo tubes, four torpedoes, and one  Uk L/30 deck gun. She had a complement of twenty-one crew members and two officers and a 42-second dive time.

Construction and career
The U-boat was ordered on 22 July 1915 and launched on 25 April 1916. She was commissioned into the German Imperial Navy on 17 August 1916 as SM UB-40.

The submarine sank 100 ships in 28 patrols. UB-40 was scuttled in Ostend when the German army retreated from Belgium on 5 October 1918.

The wreck of UB-40 has been located & identified by divers in the recent years.

Summary of raiding history

References

Notes

Citations

Bibliography 

 

1916 ships
Ships built in Hamburg
World War I submarines of Germany
German Type UB II submarines
U-boats commissioned in 1916
U-boats scuttled in 1918
Maritime incidents in 1918